Mark Hollingsworth Jr. (born April 9, 1954) is an American prelate of the Episcopal Church, who currently serves as the 11th Bishop of Ohio.

Early life
Hollingsworth was the son of  Caroline Jeanes and Mark Hollingsworth Sr., chairman of paper manufacturer Hollingsworth & Vose in East Walpole, Massachusetts. He was raised in Dover, Massachusetts, along with four sisters. He attended St. Paul's School in Concord, New Hampshire.

He received a Bachelor of Arts degree in 1976 from Trinity College in Hartford, Connecticut, majoring in religious studies. There, he was a member of St. Anthony Hall. He received a Master of Divinity degree at the Church Divinity School of the Pacific in 1981. Later, he received an honorary Doctor of Divinity from the Church Divinity School of the Pacific.

William E. Swing, bishop of California, ordained him deacon and priest in 1981 and 1982, respectively.

Career
From 1981 to 1983, Hollingsworth was the chaplain of the Cathedral School for Boys in San Francisco, California. He served as the associate rector of St. Francis in-the-Fields Church in Harrods Creek, Kentucky from 1983 to 1986. Next, he was rector of St. Anne's in-the-Fields in Lincoln, Massachusetts from 1986 to 1994. From 1994 to 2004, he was the Archdeacon of the Diocese of Massachusetts.

On November 15, 2003, Hollingsworth was elected the 11th and current bishop of the Episcopal Diocese of Ohio. He was consecrated on April 17, 2004, in Cleveland, Ohio. 

Hollingsworth founded Epiphany at Sea, a program taking inner-city middle school students to sea on fishing schooners. He was a conference leader for CREDO, and served on its advisory board. His is also a trustee for the Bexley-Seabury Seminary, Episcopal Preaching Foundation, the Ocean Classroom Foundation, the Church Divinity School of the Pacific, and Kenyon College.

Personal life 
Hollingsworth married Susan Melville Hunt on July 30, 1988. She was a candidate for a Ph.D. from Harvard University. She is the daughter of Priscilla and Richard M. Hunt of Cambridge, Massachusetts. Her father was a marshal and senior lecturer of Harvard University. They are the parents of Sophie, Isaac, Eli, and Lily.

See also

 List of Episcopal bishops of the United States
 Historical list of the Episcopal bishops of the United States

External links
Episcopal Diocese of Ohio

References

1954 births
Living people
People from Dover, Massachusetts
Trinity College (Connecticut) alumni
Church Divinity School of the Pacific alumni
Members of the Kenyon College Board of Trustees
People from Cuyahoga County, Ohio
Episcopal bishops of Ohio

St. Anthony Hall
American Episcopalians
St. Paul's School (New Hampshire) alumni